Keble Road is a short road running east–west in central Oxford, England. To the west is the southern end of the Banbury Road with St Giles' Church opposite. To the east is Parks Road with the University Parks opposite. Blackhall Road leads off the road to the south near the western end.

On the south side for much of its length is the Victorian brick Keble College, and in particular, its large chapel on the corner with Parks Road. Opposite this to the north is a row of Victorian terrace houses owned by the University of Oxford. The houses nearest Parks Road (numbers 6–11) have been converted into the Oxford University Computing Laboratory (OUCL) with its newer Wolfson Building added behind in 1993, and the Oxford e-Science Building in 2006 (both in Parks Road).

The university's 1960s Denys Wilkinson Building (Particle physics, John Adams Institute and astrophysics) is in Keble Road, on the corner with Banbury Road. The Department of Theoretical Physics is at 1 Keble Road.

The area to the north of Keble Road, bounded by Banbury Road and Parks Road, is known as the Keble Road Triangle and forms part of Oxford University's Science Area, with a number of its science department buildings located here.

A blue plaque commemorating James Legge, Sinologist and translator, first Professor of Chinese at Oxford, was unveiled at 3 Keble Road, on 16 May 2018.

Gallery

References

External links

Sub-departments of the Department of Physics of the University of Oxford, located on Keble Road:
Particle physics
Astrophysics
Theoretical physics

Streets in Oxford
Keble College, Oxford
Oxford University Computing Laboratory
Department of Computer Science, University of Oxford